Barreto  is a surname of Portuguese origin, also found in the former Portuguese colonies of Brazil, Angola, Mozambique, Timor-Leste and Goa as well as Spain and Latin America. In 1786, the title of Conde de Casa Barreto was created by King Charles III of Spain and bestowed upon Jacinto Tomás Barreto of Havana, Cuba.

Occasionally, the surname has been spelled Barretto in the United States (e.g. Larry Barretto and Ray Barretto).

People with the surname

Academics
Ada Kouri Barreto (1917-2005), Cuban cardiologist
Fausto Barreto (1852-1915), Brazilian philologist
Jenny Anne Barretto, Filipina geologist and geophysicist
Lourdino Barreto, musicologist
Matt A. Barreto (born 1976), American political scientist
Paulo S. L. M. Barreto (born 1965), Brazilian cryptographer

Artists and writers
Alexandra Barreto (born 1975), American actress
Bruno Barreto (born 1955) Brazilian film director
Chiquita Barreto (born 1947), Paraguayan writer
Claudine Barreto (born 1979), Filipino actress
Eduardo Barreto (1954-2011), Uruguayan comics artist
Don Marino Barreto Jr. (1925-1971), Cuban singer
Fábio Barreto (1957–2019), Brazilian filmmaker
Federico Barreto (1862-1929), Peruvian poet and writer
Guillermo Barreto (1929-1991), Cuban musician
Juan Cancio Barreto (born 1950), Paraguayan musician
Juan Carlos Barreto (born 1957), Mexican actor
Julia Barretto (born 1997), Filipino actress
Júlio Francisco Adeodato Barreto (1905-1937) Indo-Portuguese writer
Krissann Barretto (born 1995), Indian Television Actress
Larry Barretto (1890-1971), American novelist and war correspondent
Lia Menna Barreto (born 1959), Brazilian artist
Lima Barreto (1881-1922), Brazilian writer
Lima Barreto (director) (1906-1982), Brazilian director
Luiz Carlos Barreto (born 1928), Brazilian film producer
Pepe Barreto, Peruvian-American entertainment reporter
Rafael Barreto (singer) (born 1985), Brazilian singer/songwriter
Ray Barretto (1929-2006), Puerto Rican-American bandleader and percussionist
Rhianne Barreto (born 1997/1998), British actress
Román Viñoly Barreto (1914-1970), Uruguayan-Argentine film director
Tobias Barreto (1839-1889), Brazilian writer

Clergy
Anthony Alwyn Fernandes Barreto, Bishop of Sindhudurg
Melchior Nunes Barreto, 16th-century missionary
Pascual Díaz y Barreto (1876-1936), Mexican prelate
Pedro Barreto (born 1944), Peruvian Catholic cardinal

Military personnel
Antonio Barreto, Sri Lankan Sinhala Karava soldier who gained the title "Prince of Uva" under the name Kuruvita Rala in the Kingdom of Kandy
Isabel Barreto (1567-1612), first woman to be a navy Admiral
Jorge Otero Barreto (born 1937), American soldier
João de Deus Mena Barreto (1874 – 1933), member of the military junta which governed Brazil
José Luís Mena Barreto (1817–79), Brazilian military leader
Luís do Rego Barreto (1777-1840), Portuguese military leader and colonial administrator

Politicians
Francisco Barreto (1520-1573), Portuguese military, explorer and Viceroy of Portuguese India (1555-1558)
Greg Barreto, American politician
Hector Barreto Jr., 21st Administrator of the U.S. Small Business Administration
Honório Barreto (1813–1859), Luso-African Governor of the Portuguese colony of Guinea
Jackson Barreto, governor of Sergipe, Brazil
Jorge Barreto Xavier (born 1965), Portuguese cultural manager, Secretary of State for Culture of Portugal from October 2012 - October 2015
Juan Barreto (born 1959), Venezuelan politician and mayor of Caracas (2004-2008)
Leonardo Argüello Barreto (1875-1947), President of Nicaragua
Manuel Delgado Barreto (1879-1936), Spanish far-right politician
Roberto Molina Barreto  (born 1955), Guatemalan attorney-general

Sportspeople
André Barreto, Brazilian footballer
Augusto Barreto (1923-2017), Portuguese fencer
Carlos Barreto (boxer) (1976-1999), Venezuelan boxer
Carlos Barreto (fighter) (born 1968), Brazilian MMA fighter
 Claudemir Jeronimo Barreto (born 1981), better known as Cacau, Brazilian footballer
Diego Barreto (born 1981), Paraguayan football goalkeeper
Édgar Barreto (born 1984), Paraguayan football player, brother of Diego Barreto
Francisco Barretto Júnior (born 1989), Brazilian gymnast
Franklin Barreto (born 1991), Venezuelan baseball player
Gonzalo Barreto (born 1992), Uruguayan football player
Gustavo Bonatto Barreto (born 1991), Brazilian football player
Herman Barreto (born 1926), Venezuelan sport shooter
Hernan Barreto (born 1991), Argentine Paralympic athlete
Jhonlen Barreto (born 1987), Venezuelan volleyball player
Jose Ramirez Barreto (born 1976), Brazilian football player
Juciely Cristina Barreto (born 1980), Brazilian volleyball player
Kaleem Barreto, Scottish rugby union player
Marcos Barreto (born 1960), Mexican runner 
Mariano Barreto (born 1957), Portuguese football manager
Mickaël Barreto (born 1991), French football player
Miguel Barreto, Argentine football player
Nuno Barreto (born 1972), Portuguese bronze medal winner at 1996 Summer Olympics for Sailing, men's 470 team competition
Paulo Vitor Barreto (born 1985), Brazilian football player
Ramón Barreto (1939-2015), Uruguayan football referee
Sergio Barreto (born 1999), Argentine football player
Vlademir Jeronimo Barreto (born 1979), Brazilian football player
Vincy Barretto (born 1999), Indian football player
Ysis Barreto (born 1980), Venezuelan judoka

See also
Barreto (disambiguation)

References

Portuguese-language surnames